ABIC - Associação dos Bolseiros de Investigação Científica is the Portuguese association of grant-holding researchers. ABIC was established in 2003 and represents early stage researchers, such as doctoral students, and post-doc fellows as well as researchers who are not included is these two groups but are grant-holders. This association originated in a group of researchers who gathered in 2001 to write a document  to be presented to all the stakeholders involved with research in Portugal. This group called “plataforma de bolseiros de investigação científica (PBIC)” evolved into ABIC.
ABIC's main activities have been in the following areas: i) to alert the funding agencies in Portugal such as FCT (www.fct.mctes.pt) that the grant-holding researchers should have social benefits and pension schemes as recommended in The European Charter for Researchers ; ii) to urge the government to open the positions available in the public sector and not use grant-holders researchers as cheap labour in Portugal; iii) to persuade the government to deliver policies which are able to create scientific jobs, both in the public and private sector.

ABIC is member of  Eurodoc, the European federation of national organisations of young researchers. ABIC is also a member of the World Federation of Scientific Workers (website)

The most active ABIC on-line resource is the bulletin board (forum.bolseiros.org) written in Portuguese but, in general, young Portuguese read and write English fluently.

ABIC structure 

Direction board 

General Assembly board 

Council Tax board

Portuguese local sections 

 Young researchers Aveiro University 
 Young researchers Minho University  
 Young researchers Oeiras 
 Young researchers FCT-UNL  
 Young researchers Porto

See also

Austrian National Union of Students - Equivalent organisation in Austria.
Confédération des jeunes chercheurs - Equivalent organisation in France.
National Postgraduate Committee - Equivalent organisation in the United Kingdom.
Thesis - Equivalent organisation in Germany.
EURODOC European Council of doctoral candidates and junior researchers. ABIC is a member.

2003 establishments in Portugal
National postgraduate representative bodies
Youth organisations based in Portugal
Non-profit organisations based in Portugal
Education in Portugal
Science and technology in Portugal